A by-election for the seat of Orange in the New South Wales Legislative Assembly was held on 12 November 2016. The by-election was triggered by the resignation of Nationals MP Andrew Gee on 6 May to contest the division of Calare at the 2016 federal election. The by-election was won by Philip Donato of the Shooters, Fishers and Farmers Party—the first seat won by the party in a state lower house.

By-elections for the seats of Canterbury and Wollongong were held on the same day.

Background
The federal seat of Calare was vacated at the 2016 federal election by the retirement of John Cobb, who had held the seat for the National Party since 2007, and the seat of Parkes before that. On 30 April 2016, state member for Orange Andrew Gee contested and won a Nationals preselection ballot against three other candidates.

Although Orange was considered a safe Nationals seat with Gee holding the seat on a margin of 21.7 and the party having held the seat since 1947, a backlash against the Nationals was expected due in part to the Baird government's previous proposal to ban greyhound racing and the merger of a number of local councils.

Dates

Candidates
The eight candidates in ballot paper order are as follows:

Results

Andrew Gee resigned to successfully contest Calare at the 2016 federal election.On election night, a notional two-party-preferred count was conducted between the Nationals and Labor, which was abandoned when it became apparent that the Shooters, Fishers and Farmers Party would be in second place. A two-candidate-preferred check count completed on 16 November showed the SFFP ahead by 84 votes. When the official distribution of preferences took place on 17 November, the count ended with the Nationals in front by 66 votes. The Shooters Party contested the result, claiming an error in the count of about 100 votes. A review of the ballots found a bundle of votes had been wrongly applied in the distribution, and the result was a win for Philip Donato by 55 votes. The National Party requested a recount, which was granted and was conducted Monday 21 November. The recount confirmed the Shooters, Fishers and Farmers Party's win by a margin of 50 votes.

See also
Electoral results for the district of Orange
List of New South Wales state by-elections

References

2016 elections in Australia
New South Wales state by-elections
2010s in New South Wales